Kevin Devine (born December 11, 1974) is a former professional American football player who played defensive back for three seasons for the  Jacksonville Jaguars and Minnesota Vikings

References

1974 births
American football cornerbacks
California Golden Bears football players
Jacksonville Jaguars players
Living people
Minnesota Vikings players